Samchul (also Romanized as Samchūl) is a village in Ashrestaq Rural District, Yaneh Sar District, Behshahr County, Mazandaran Province, Iran. At the 2006 census, its population was 349, in 79 families قربانی.

References 

Populated places in Behshahr County